Parla is a municipality in the Community of Madrid, Spain. It is located in the southern part of the region, approximately 20 km from the capital, Madrid.

History

Origins 
Earliest evidence of human occupation includes stone tools made of Paleolithic chert, of the kind utilized by Stone Age people. Starting in approximately 200 CE, nomadic people from the coast began to settle the area, bringing their knowledge of metalworking (copper), ranching, agriculture, and weaving. These early settlers lived primarily along the Humanejos stream.

During the 4th and 5th centuries, the ranks of the local populations swelled to include newly arrived Celtic tribes from central Europe. The Celts brought with them various advanced technologies that included ironworking and fired ceramics. The local population was sustained mostly by ranching and agriculture.

Independent local development was interrupted by the arrival of the Carthagineans and Romans, the latter of whom recorded the history of the pre-Roman villages of the area. Local Roman artifacts include a number of grave markers and coins.

After the Battle of Guadalete (711), which signified the beginning of the Islamic conquest of Hispania, Parla and its inhabitants were a part of the territory governed by the Umayyad Caliphate. Parla once again appeared as an independent township during the Reconquista.

Modern times 
The territory was part of the Alfoz of Madrid, a Spanish medieval territorial designation for the land surrounding a village during the Reconquista. At the time, there were two major villages in the area: Parla, to the north, and Humanejos to the south. Humanejos disappeared around the year 1650.

The first document to reference Parla is a letter which King Alfonso XI of Castile wrote on 6 January 1338 in Trujillo, ceding control of the hamlet of Parla to the cardinal as payment for his help in the fight against the Moors. This document was later affirmed by King Peter of Castile on 7 December 1351.

After the Peninsular War, Parla became home to a large number of poor refugees from other localities. Around this time it achieves the status of township.

Politics and government 

The current mayor is José María Fraile (PSOE), who was elected in 2008. The previous mayor, Tomás Gómez Franco, resigned from his post in October 2008 to accept the position of secretary general of the PSOE.

The majority of local politics involves three of the major political parties: the Spanish Socialist Workers' Party (PSOE), the Popular Party (PP), and the United Left (IU).

During the 2007 Spanish regional elections, the PSOE carried 74.43% of the vote and retained 20 town councillors. In comparison, the People's Party carried only 16.61% of the vote (4 councillors), while the IU carried 6.15% (1 councillor). The other political parties were unable to obtain sufficient votes to gain representation on the town council.

Local elections take place every four years, and are held in conjunction with the autonomous elections of the Community of Madrid. The next elections will take place in the year 2011.

The local government is divided into the following departments (called concejalía):

Location 

The municipality of Parla covers an area of 24.43 km². It borders six municipalities of the community of Madrid: Fuenlabrada to the North; Torrejón de Velasco and Torrejón de la Calzada to the South; Pinto to the East; and Griñón and Humanes de Madrid to the West.

Its elevation is 648.5 meters above sea level.

Demographics

Evolution 
At the beginning of the 20th century, Parla had a population of 1,237. The municipality then underwent a population explosion, until reaching its current population of 150,000 (INE 2008).

The majority of population growth occurred during the late 1960s due to the major urban migration that was occurring in Spain at the time. Between 1960 and 1970, the population grew 470%, from 1,809 inhabitants to 10,317. This migration continued at an elevated rate during the 1970s, as people from Castilla-La Mancha, Andalusia and Extremadura settled in the area in order to commute to Madrid.

Starting in 1996, Parla once more began to experience a noticeable population growth, this time due to immigration from Algeria, Morocco, Romania, Poland, and sub-saharan Africa. This trend continues today.

People  
 Javier Castillejo, boxer
 Juan José Ballesta, actor
 Cristina Sánchez, former bullfighter
 Rafael "Rafa" Benítez, football coach
 Iván Calero, football player
 Javier Camuñas Gallego, football player
 Javier Muñoz, football player 
 José Ignacio Zahínos, football player
 Borja Mayoral, football player

Twin towns 
  Callosa de Segura, Spain
   Valladolid, Spain
  Funchal, Portugal
   Badalona, Spain

See also
Community of Madrid
Iglesia gótico-mudéjar de Humanejos, demolished building near Parla
Madrid metropolitan area

References 

 
Municipalities in the Community of Madrid